Stanley Larson Welsh (born 1928) is an American botanist. He has worked as professor of integrative biology at Brigham Young University for 44 years and was the founding curator of that university's herbarium, which is named after him. His fields are North American and Tahitian flora, especially the genera Astragalus, Oxytropis and Atriplex.

Selected publications 

 stanley larson Welsh; sherel Goodrich. 1980. Miscellaneous Plant Novelties from Alaska, Nevada, and Utah. Great Basin Naturalist 40:78-88

Books 
 1960. Legumes of the north-central states: Galegeae. Ed. Iowa Agricultural & Home Economics Experiment Station. 249 pp.
 2003. North American Species of Atriplex Linnaeus (Chenopodiaceae): A Taxonomic Revision. 
 nephi duane Atwood, sherel Goodrich, stanley larson Welsh. 2007. A Utah Flora. Ed. Brigham Young University.

References

External links 
 http://www.ipni.org/ipni/authorsearch?id=11539-1&query_type=by_id&output_format=object_view

21st-century American botanists
Living people
1928 births
Brigham Young University faculty